Silvio Berlusconi (born 29 September 1936) is an Italian media tycoon and politician who served as Prime Minister of Italy in four governments from 1994 to 1995, 2001 to 2006 and 2008 to 2011. He was a member of the Chamber of Deputies from 1994 to 2013, and has served as a member of the Senate of the Republic since 2022, and previously from March to November 2013, and as a Member of the European Parliament (MEP) since 2019, and previously from 1999 to 2001.

Berlusconi is the controlling shareholder of Mediaset and owned the Italian football club A.C. Milan from 1986 to 2017. He is nicknamed Il Cavaliere (The Knight) for his Order of Merit for Labour; he voluntarily resigned from this order in March 2014. In 2018, Forbes ranked him as the 190th richest man in the world with a net worth of US$8 billion. In 2009, Forbes ranked him 12th in the list of the World's Most Powerful People due to his domination of Italian politics throughout more than twenty years at the head of the centre-right coalition.

Berlusconi was Prime Minister for nine years in total, making him the longest serving post-war Prime Minister of Italy, and the third longest-serving since Italian unification, after Benito Mussolini and Giovanni Giolitti. He was the leader of the centre-right party Forza Italia from 1994 to 2009, and its successor party The People of Freedom from 2009 to 2013. Since November 2013, he has led a revived Forza Italia. Berlusconi was the senior G8 leader from 2009 until 2011, and he currently holds the record for hosting G8 summits (having hosted three summits in Italy). After serving nearly 19 years as a member of the Chamber of Deputies, the country's lower house, he became a member of the Senate following the 2013 Italian general election.

On 1 August 2013, Berlusconi was convicted of tax fraud by the Supreme Court of Cassation. His four-year prison sentence was confirmed, and he was banned from holding public office for two years. Aged 76, he was exempted from direct imprisonment, and instead served his sentence by doing unpaid community service. In Italy, three years are automatically pardoned; he had been sentenced to a gross imprisonment for more than two years, and the anti-corruption Severino law, which banned him from six-years, expelled him from the Senate. Berlusconi pledged to stay leader of Forza Italia throughout his custodial sentence and public office ban. After his ban ended, Berlusconi ran for and was elected as an MEP at the 2019 European Parliament election. He returned to the Senate after winning a seat in the 2022 Italian general election.

Berlusconi was the first person to assume the premiership without having held any prior government or administrative offices. He is known for his populist political style and brash personality. In his long tenure, he was often accused of being an authoritarian leader and a strongman. Berlusconi still remains a controversial figure who divides public opinion and political analysts. Supporters emphasize his leadership skills and charismatic power, his fiscal policy based on tax reduction, and his ability to maintain strong and close foreign relations with both the United States and Russia. In general, critics address his performance as a politician and the ethics of his government practices in relation to his business holdings. Issues with the former include accusations of having mismanaged the state budget and of increasing the Italian government debt. The second criticism concerns his vigorous pursuit of his personal interests while in office, including benefitting from his own companies' growth due to policies promoted by his governments, having vast conflicts of interest due to ownership of a media empire, with which he has restricted freedom of information, and being blackmailed as leader because of his turbulent private life.

Family background and personal life 
Berlusconi was born in 1936 in Milan, where he was raised in a middle-class family. His father, Luigi Berlusconi (1908–1989), was a bank employee, and his mother, Rosa Bossi (1911–2008), a housewife. He was the first of three children; he had a sister, Maria Francesca Antonietta (1943–2009), and has a brother, Paolo (born 1949). He has ten grandchildren.

After completing his secondary school education at a Salesian college, Berlusconi studied law at the University of Milan, graduating with honours in 1961, with a thesis on the legal aspects of advertising. He was not required to serve the standard one-year stint in the Italian army which was compulsory at the time. During his university studies, he was an upright bass player in a group formed with the now Mediaset Chairman and amateur pianist Fedele Confalonieri and occasionally performed as a cruise ship crooner. In later life, he wrote A.C. Milan's anthem with the Italian music producer and pop singer Tony Renis and Forza Italia's anthem with the opera director Renato Serio. With the Neapolitan singer Mariano Apicella, he wrote two Neapolitan song albums: Meglio 'na canzone in 2003 and L'ultimo amore in 2006.

In 1965, Berlusconi married Carla Elvira Dall'Oglio, and they had two children: Maria Elvira, better known as Marina (born 1966), and Pier Silvio (born 1969). By 1980, Berlusconi had established a relationship with the actress Veronica Lario (born Miriam Bartolini), with whom he subsequently had three children: Barbara (born 1984), Eleonora (born 1986) and Luigi (born 1988). He was divorced from Dall'Oglio in 1985, and married Lario in 1990. By this time, Berlusconi was a well-known entrepreneur, and his wedding was a notable social event. One of his best men was Bettino Craxi, a former prime minister and leader of the Italian Socialist Party. In May 2009, Lario announced that she was to file for divorce.

On 28 December 2012, Berlusconi was ordered to pay his ex-wife Veronica Lario $48 million a year in a divorce settlement that was filed Christmas Day but could keep the $100 million house they live in with their three children.

In April 2017, Berlusconi appeared in a video promoting a vegetarian Easter campaign. He was shown cuddling lambs he had adopted to save from slaughtering for the traditional Easter Sunday feast; he did not confirm or deny whether he himself is a vegetarian.

Business career

Milano Due 

Berlusconi's business career began in construction. In the late 1960s, he built Milano Due (Italian for "Milan Two"), a development of 4,000 residential apartments east of Milan. It was a residential centre in the Italian town of Segrate and was built as a new town by Edilnord, a Berlusconi-owned company associated with the Fininvest group.

The main peculiarity of Milano Due is a system of walkways and bridges that connects the whole neighbourhood so that it is possible to walk around without ever intersecting traffic. The works started in 1970 and were completed in 1979. Distinctive landmarks are the sporting facilities, a small artificial lake and a children's playground.

The profits from this venture provided the seed money for his advertising agency.

TeleMilano 
Berlusconi first entered the media world in 1973, by setting up a small cable television company, TeleMilano, to service units built on his Segrate properties. It began transmitting in September the following year. TeleMilano was the first Italian private television channel and later evolved into Canale 5, the first national private TV station.

After buying two further channels, Berlusconi relocated the station to central Milan in 1977 and began broadcasting over the airwaves.

Fininvest 

In 1978, Berlusconi founded his first media group, Fininvest, and joined the Propaganda Due masonic lodge. In the five years leading up to 1983, he earned some 113 billion Italian lire (€58.3 million). The funding sources are still unknown because of a complex system of holding companies, despite investigations conducted by various state attorneys.

Fininvest soon expanded into a country-wide network of local TV stations which had similar programming, forming, in effect, a single national network. This was seen as breaching the Italian public broadcaster RAI's statutory monopoly by creating a national network, which was later abolished. In 1980, Berlusconi founded Italy's first private national network, Canale 5, followed shortly thereafter by Italia 1, which was bought from the Rusconi family in 1982, and Rete 4, which was bought from Mondadori in 1984. He then launched three international sister networks: La Cinq (1986), Tele 5 (1988), and Telecinco (1989). La Cinq and Tele 5 ceased operations in 1992 and were later replaced by La Cinquième and DSF, respectively.

Berlusconi created the first and only Italian commercial TV empire. He was assisted by his connections to Bettino Craxi, secretary-general of the Italian Socialist Party and also the prime minister of Italy at that time, whose government passed, on 20 October 1984, an emergency decree legalising the nationwide transmissions made by Berlusconi's television stations. This was in response to judgements on 16 October 1984, in Turin, Pescara and Rome, enforcing a law which previously restricted nationwide broadcasting to RAI, that had ordered these private networks to cease transmitting.

After political turmoil in 1985, the decree was approved definitively; for some years, Berlusconi's three channels remained in legal limbo and were not allowed to broadcast news and political commentary. They were elevated to the status of full national TV channels in 1990 by the Mammì law, named after Oscar Mammì. In 1987, it bought out home video distributor Domovideo, in a seesaw contest with Vincenzo Romagnoli.

In 1995, Berlusconi sold a portion of his media holdings, first to the German media group Kirch Group (now bankrupt) and then by public offer. In 1999, Berlusconi expanded his media interests by forming a partnership with Kirch called the Epsilon MediaGroup.

On 9 July 2011, a Milan court ordered Fininvest to pay 560 million euros in damages to Compagnie Industriali Riunite in a long-running legal dispute.

On 5 August 2016, Fininvest announced the signing of a preliminary agreement to sell all of their shares of A.C. Milan to Sino-Europe Sports Investment Management Changxing Co.Ltd. The deal was scheduled to be finalized by the end of 2016. On 13 April 2017, Berlusconi sold Milan to Rossoneri Sport Investment Lux for a total of €830 million after a 31-year reign.

Political career 

Berlusconi rapidly rose to the forefront of Italian politics in January 1994. He was elected to the Chamber of Deputies for the first time and appointed as Prime Minister following the 1994 Italian general election, when Forza Italia gained a relative majority a mere three months after having been launched. His cabinet collapsed after nine months due to internal disagreements among the coalition parties. In the 1996 Italian general election, Berlusconi was defeated by the centre-left candidate Romano Prodi. In the 2001 Italian general election, he was again the centre-right candidate for Prime Minister and won against the centre-left candidate Francesco Rutelli. Berlusconi then formed his second and third cabinets, until 2006. Berlusconi was the leader of the centre-right coalition in the 2006 Italian general election, which he lost by a very narrow margin, his opponent again being Prodi. He was re-elected in the 2008 Italian general election following the collapse of the Prodi II Cabinet and sworn in for the third time as Prime Minister on 8 May 2008.

After losing his majority in parliament amid growing fiscal problems related to the European debt crisis, the resignation of Berlusconi as Prime Minister came on 16 November 2011. Berlusconi led the People of Freedom and its right-wing allies in the campaign for the 2013 Italian general election. Although he initially planned to run for a fifth term as Prime Minister, as part of the agreement with the Lega Nord, he would instead plan to lead the coalition without becoming Prime Minister. Berlusconi's centre-right coalition gained 29% of votes, ranking second, after the centre-left coalition Italy Common Good led by Pier Luigi Bersani. Subsequently, Berlusconi's allies supported the Letta Cabinet headed by Enrico Letta of the Democratic Party, together with the centrist Civic Choice of former Prime Minister Mario Monti.

Berlusconi was criticised for his electoral coalitions with right-wing populist parties (Lega Nord and the National Alliance) and for apologetic remarks about Mussolini; he also officially apologised for Italy's actions in Libya during colonial rule. While in power, Berlusconi maintained ownership of Mediaset, the largest media company in Italy, and was criticised for his dominance of the Italian media. His leadership was also undermined by sex scandals.

Beginnings 

Berlusconi's political career began in 1994, when he entered politics, reportedly admitting to Indro Montanelli and Enzo Biagi that he was forced to do so to avoid imprisonment. He subsequently served as Prime Minister of Italy from 1994 to 1995, 2001 to 2006, and 2008 to 2011. His career was racked with controversies and trials; amongst these was his failure to honour his promise to sell his personal assets in Mediaset, the largest television broadcaster in Italy, to dispel any perceived conflicts of interest.

In the early 1990s, the five governing parties known as the Pentapartito, including Christian Democracy, the Italian Socialist Party, the Italian Social-Democratic Party, the Italian Republican Party and the Italian Liberal Party, lost much of their electoral strength almost overnight due to a large number of judicial investigations concerning the financial corruption of many of their foremost members in the Mani Pulite affair. This led to a general expectation that upcoming elections would be won by the Democratic Party of the Left, the heirs to the former Italian Communist Party, and their Alliance of Progressives coalition unless an alternative arose. On 26 January 1994, Berlusconi announced his decision to enter politics, in his own words to "enter the field", presenting his own political party, Forza Italia, on a platform focused on defeating communists. His political aim was to convince the voters of the Pentapartito, who were shocked and confused by Mani Pulite scandals, that Forza Italia offered both a fresh uniqueness and the continuation of the pro-Western free-market policies followed by Italy since the end of World War II. Shortly after he decided to enter the political arena, investigators into the Mani Pulite affair were said to be close to issuing warrants for the arrest of Berlusconi and senior executives of his business group. During his political career, Berlusconi repeatedly stated that the Mani Pulite investigations were led by communist prosecutors who wanted to establish a soviet-style government in Italy.

1994 electoral victory 

To win the March 1994 general election, Berlusconi formed two separate electoral alliances: Pole of Freedoms (Polo delle Libertà) with Lega Nord (Northern League) in northern Italian districts, and another, the Pole of Good Government (Polo del Buon Governo), with the National Alliance (Alleanza Nazionale), heir to the Italian Social Movement, in central and southern regions. In a pragmatic move, he did not ally with the latter in the North because Lega Nord disliked them, and Forza Italia was allied with two parties that were not allied with each other.

Berlusconi launched a massive campaign of electoral advertisements on his three TV networks and prepared his top advertising salesmen with seminars and screen tests, of whom 50 were subsequently elected despite an absence of legislative experience. He subsequently won the elections, with Forza Italia garnering 21% of the popular vote, more than any other single party. One of the most significant promises that he made to secure victory was that his government would create "one million more jobs". He was appointed Prime Minister in 1994, but his term in office was short because of the inherent contradictions in his coalition: the League, a regional party with a strong electoral base in northern Italy, was at that time fluctuating between federalist and separatist positions and the National Alliance was a nationalist party that had yet to renounce neo-fascism at the time.

Fall of the Berlusconi I Cabinet 

In December 1994, following the leaking to the press of news of a fresh investigation by Milan magistrates, Umberto Bossi, leader of the Lega Nord, left the coalition claiming that the electoral pact had not been respected, forcing Berlusconi to resign from office and shifting the majority's weight to the centre-left. Lega Nord also resented the fact that many of its MPs had switched to Forza Italia, allegedly lured by promises of more prestigious portfolios. In 1998, various articles attacking Berlusconi were published by Lega Nord's official newspaper La Padania, with titles such as "La Fininvest è nata da Cosa Nostra" ("Fininvest [Berlusconi's principal company] was founded by the Mafia").

Berlusconi remained as caretaker prime minister for a little over a month until his replacement by a technocratic government headed by Lamberto Dini. Dini had been a key minister in the Berlusconi cabinet, and Berlusconi said the only way he would support a technocratic government would be if Dini headed it. In the end, Dini was supported by most of the opposition parties but not by Forza Italia and Lega Nord. In 1996, Berlusconi and his coalition lost the elections and were replaced by a centre-left government led by Romano Prodi.

2001 electoral victory 

In 2001, Berlusconi ran again, as leader of the right-wing coalition House of Freedoms (La Casa delle Libertà), which included the Union of Christian and Centre Democrats, Lega Nord, the National Alliance and other parties. Berlusconi's success in the May 2001 general election led to him becoming Prime Minister once more, with the coalition receiving 49.6% of the vote for the Chamber of Deputies and 42.5% for the Senate of the Republic.

On the television interviews programme Porta a Porta, during the last days of the electoral campaign, Berlusconi created a powerful impression on the public by undertaking to sign the Contratto con gli Italiani (Contract with the Italians), an idea copied by his advisor Luigi Crespi from Newt Gingrich's Contract with America introduced six weeks before the 1994 U.S. elections. This was considered to be a creative masterstroke in his 2001 bid for prime ministership. Berlusconi committed in this contract to improving several aspects of the Italian economy and life, and promised to not stand for re-election in 2006 if he failed to honour at least four of these five promises. Firstly, he undertook to simplify the complex tax system by introducing just two income tax rates (33% for those earning over 100,000 euros, and 23% for anyone earning less than that figure: anyone earning less than 11,000 euros a year would not be taxed). Secondly, he promised to halve the unemployment rate. Thirdly, he committed to financing and developing a massive new public works programme. Fourthly, he promised to raise the minimum monthly pension rate to 516 euros. Fifthly, he would reduce crime by introducing police officers to patrol all local zones and areas in Italy's major cities.

Berlusconi II Cabinet 

Opposition parties claim Berlusconi was not able to achieve the goals he promised in his Contratto con gli Italiani. Some of his partners in government, especially the National Alliance and the Union of Christian and Centre Democrats, admitted the Government fell short of the promises made in the agreement, attributing the failure to an unforeseeable downturn in global economic conditions. Berlusconi himself consistently asserted that he achieved all the goals of the agreement, and said his Government provided un miracolo continuo (a continuous miracle) that made all 'earlier governments pale' (by comparison). He attributed the widespread failure to recognise these achievements to a campaign of mystification and vilification in the print media, asserting that 85% of newspapers were opposed to him. Luca Ricolfi, an independent analyst, held that Berlusconi had managed to deliver only one promise out of five, the one concerning minimum pension rates. According to Ricolfi, the other four promises were not honoured, in particular the undertakings on tax simplification and crime reduction.

Subsequent elections 
The House of Freedoms did not do as well in the 2003 local elections as it did in the 2001 national elections. In common with many other European governing groups, in the 2004 elections to the European Parliament, gained 43.37% support. Forza Italia's support was also reduced from 29.5% to 21.0% (in the 1999 European elections Forza Italia had 25.2%). As an outcome of these results the other coalition parties, whose electoral results were more satisfactory, asked Berlusconi and Forza Italia for greater influence on the government's political line.

Berlusconi III Cabinet 

In the regional elections on 3–4 April 2005, centre-left candidates for regional presidencies won in 12 out of 14 regions where control of local governments and presidencies were at stake. Berlusconi's coalition held only two of the regions (Lombardy and Veneto) up for re-election. Three parties, Union of Christian and Centre Democrats, National Alliance and New Italian Socialist Party, threatened to withdraw from the Berlusconi government. Berlusconi after some hesitation, then presented to the president of Italy a request for the dissolution of his government on 20 April. On 23 April, he formed a new government with the same allies, reshuffling ministers and amending the government programme. A key point demanded by the Union of Christian and Centre Democrats and to a lesser extent by the National Alliance for their continued support was that the strong focus on tax reduction be reduced.

Attempt to reform the Italian constitution 
A key point in the Berlusconi government's programme was a planned reform of the Italian constitution, which Berlusconi considered to be inspired by the Soviet Union, an issue on which the coalition parties themselves initially had significantly different opinions. Lega Nord insisted on a federalist reform (devolution of more power to the regions) as a condition for remaining in the coalition. The National Alliance party pushed for a strong premiership (more powers to the Prime Minister), intended as a counterweight to any federalist reform, to preserve the integrity of the nation. The Union of Christian and Centre Democrats asked for a proportional electoral law that would not damage small parties, and was generally more willing to discuss compromises with the moderate wing of the opposition.

Difficulties in negotiating an agreement caused some internal unrest in the Berlusconi government in 2003, but they were mostly overcome and the law including devolution of powers to the regions, Federal Senate, and strong premiership, was passed by the Senate in April 2004; it was slightly modified by the Chamber of Deputies in October 2004, and again in October 2005, and finally approved by the Senate on 16 November 2005, with a narrow majority. Approval in a referendum is necessary to amend the Italian constitution without a qualified two-thirds parliamentary majority. The referendum was held on 25–26 July 2006 and resulted in the rejection of the constitutional reform, with 61.3% of voters casting ballots against it.

2006 general election and opposition 

Operating under a new electoral law written unilaterally by the governing parties with strong criticism from the parliamentary opposition, the April 2006 general election was held. The results of this election handed Romano Prodi's centre-left coalition, known as The Union (Berlusconi's opposition), a very thin majority: 49.8% against 49.7% for the centre-right coalition House of Freedoms in the Lower House, and a two-senator lead in the Senate (158 senators for The Union and 156 for the House of Freedoms). The Court of Cassation subsequently validated the voting procedures and determined that the election process was constitutional.

According to the new electoral rules, The Union, nicknamed "The Soviet Union" by Berlusconi, with a margin of only 25,224 votes (out of over 38 million voters) won 348 seats (compared to 281 for the House of Freedoms) in the lower house given to whichever coalition of parties was awarded more votes as a result of the majority bonus system.

This electoral law, approved shortly before the election by Berlusconi's coalition in an attempt to improve their chances of winning the election, led to the coalition's defeat and gave Prodi the chance to form a new cabinet. Prodi's coalition government consisted of a large number of smaller parties. If only one of these nine parties that formed The Union withdrew its support to Prodi, his government would have collapsed. This situation was also the result of the new electoral system.

Centrist parties such as the Union of Christian and Centre Democrats immediately conceded The Union's victory, while other parties, like Berlusconi's Forza Italia and the Northern League, refused to accept its validity, right up until 2 May 2006, when Berlusconi submitted his resignation to then President of the Republic Carlo Azeglio Ciampi.

2008 electoral victory 

In the run-up to the 2006 general election, there had been talk among some of the coalition members of the House of Freedoms about a possible merger into a "united party of moderates and reformers". Forza Italia, the National Alliance of Gianfranco Fini, and the Union of Christian and Centre Democrats of Pier Ferdinando Casini all seemed interested in the project. Soon after the election, Casini started to distance his party from its historical allies. On 2 December 2006, during a major demonstration of the centre-right in Rome against the Prodi II Cabinet, Berlusconi proposed the foundation of a Freedom Party, arguing that the people and voters of the different political movements aligned to the demonstration were all part of a people of freedom.

On 18 November 2007, after claiming the collection of more than 7 million signatures (including that of Umberto Bossi) demanding that then President of the Republic Giorgio Napolitano call a fresh election, Berlusconi announced from the running board of a car in a crowded Piazza San Babila in Milan that Forza Italia would soon merge or transform into The People of Freedom, also known as the PdL (Il Popolo della Libertà). Berlusconi also stated that this new political movement could include the participation of other parties. Both supporters and critics of the new party called Berlusconi's announcement "the running board revolution" (Italian: la rivoluzione del predellino).

After the sudden fall of the Prodi II Cabinet on 24 January, the break-up of The Union, and the subsequent political crisis, which paved the way for a fresh general election in April 2008, Berlusconi, Gianfranco Fini and other party leaders finally agreed on 8 February 2008 to form the PdL joint list, allied with Lega Nord of Bossi and the Movement for Autonomy of Raffaele Lombardo.

In the snap elections held on 13–14 April 2008, this coalition won against Walter Veltroni's centre-left coalition in both houses of the Italian Parliament. In the 315-member Senate of the Republic, Berlusconi's coalition won 174 seats to Veltroni's 134. In the lower house, Berlusconi's conservative bloc led by a margin of 9% of the vote: 46.5% (344 seats) to 37.5% (246 seats). Berlusconi capitalised on discontent over the nation's stagnating economy and the unpopularity of Prodi's government. His declared top priorities were to remove piles of rubbish from the streets of Naples and to improve the state of the Italian economy, which had under-performed the rest of the eurozone for years. He also said he was open to working with the opposition, and pledged to fight tax avoidance and tax evasion, reform the judicial system and reduce public debt. He intended to reduce the number of cabinet ministers to 12. Berlusconi and his ministers (Berlusconi IV Cabinet) were sworn in on 8 May 2008.

On 21 November 2008, the National Council of Forza Italia, chaired by Alfredo Biondi and attended by Berlusconi himself, dissolved Forza Italia and established the PdL, whose inauguration took place on 27 March 2009, the 15th anniversary of Berlusconi's first electoral victory.

While Forza Italia had never held a formal party congress to formulate its rules, procedures, and democratic balloting for candidates and issues, (since 1994 three party conventions of Forza Italia have been held, all of them resolving to support Berlusconi and reelecting him by acclamation) on 27 March 2009, at the foundation congress of the PdL political movement the statute of the new party was subject to a vote of approval. On 5,820 voting delegates, 5,811 voted in favour, 4 against and 5 abstained. During that political congress Berlusconi was elected as chairman of the PdL by a show of hands. According to the official minutes of the congress the result favoured Berlusconi, with 100 per cent of the delegates voting for him.

The People of Freedom split 

Between 2009 and 2010, Gianfranco Fini, former leader of the national conservative National Alliance (AN) and President of the Italian Chamber of Deputies, became a vocal critic of the leadership of Berlusconi. Fini departed from party's majority line on several issues but, most of all, he was a proponent of a more structured party organisation. His criticism was aimed at the leadership style of Berlusconi, who tends to rely on his personal charisma to lead the party from the centre and supports a less structured form of party, a movement-party that organises itself only at election times.

On 15 April 2010, an association named Generation Italy was launched to better represent Fini's views within the party and push for a different form of party organisation. On 22 April 2010 the National Committee of the PdL convened in Rome for the first time in a year. The conflict between Fini and Berlusconi was covered live on television. At the end of the day, a resolution proposed by Berlusconi's loyalists was put before the assembly and approved by a landslide margin. On 29 July 2010, the party executive released a document in which Fini was described as "incompatible" with the political line of the PdL and unable to perform his job of President of the Chamber of Deputies in a neutral way. Berlusconi asked Fini to step down, and the executive proposed the suspension from party membership of three MPs who had harshly criticised Berlusconi and accused some party members of criminal offences. As response, Fini and his followers formed their own groups in both chambers under the name of Future and Freedom (FLI). It was soon clear that FLI would leave the PdL and become an independent party. On 7 November, during a convention in Bastia Umbra, Fini asked Berlusconi to step down from his post of Prime Minister and proposed a new government including the Union of the Centre (UdC). A few days later, the four FLI members of the government resigned. On 14 December, FLI voted against Berlusconi in a vote of confidence in the Chamber of Deputies, a vote nonetheless won by Berlusconi by 314 to 311.

In May 2011, PdL suffered a big blow in local elections. Particularly painful was the loss of Milan, Berlusconi's hometown and party stronghold. In response to this and to conflicts within party ranks, Angelino Alfano, the Justice minister, was chosen as national secretary in charge of reorganising and renewing the party. The appointment of 40-year-old Alfano, a former Christian Democrat and later leader of Forza Italia in Sicily, was unanimously decided by the party executive. On 1 July, the National Council modified the party's constitution and Alfano was elected secretary almost unanimously. In his acceptance speech, Alfano proposed the introduction of primaries.

Resignation 
On 10 October, the Chamber of Deputies rejected the law on the budget of the state proposed by the government. As a result of this event, Berlusconi moved for a confidence vote in the Chamber on 14 October, he won the vote with just 316 votes to 310, minimum required to retain a majority. An increasing number of Deputies continued to cross the floor and join the opposition and on 8 November the Chamber approved the law on the budget of the State previously rejected but with only 308 votes, while opposition parties didn't participate in the vote to highlight that Berlusconi lost his majority. After the vote, Berlusconi announced his resignation after Parliament passed economic reforms. Among other things, his perceived failure to tackle Italy's debt crisis with an estimated debt sum of €1.9 trillion ($2.6 trillion) had urged Berlusconi to leave office. The popularity of this decision was reflected in the fact that while he was resigning crowds sang the hallelujah portion of George Frideric Handel's "Messiah", complete with some vocal accompaniment; there was also dancing in the streets outside the Quirinal Palace, the official residence of the President of Italy, where Berlusconi went to tender his resignation.

Austerity measures were passed, raising €59.8 billion from spending cuts and tax raises, including freezing public-sector salaries until 2014 and gradually increasing the retirement age for women in the private sector from 60 in 2014 to 65 in 2026. The resignation also came at a difficult time for Berlusconi, as he was involved in numerous trials for corruption, fraud and sex offences. He was often found guilty in lower courts but used loopholes in Italy's legal system to evade incarceration.

Berlusconi had also failed to meet some of his pre-election promises and had failed to prevent economic decline and introduce serious reforms. Many believed that the problems and doubts over Berlusconi's leadership and his coalition were one of the factors that contributed to market anxieties over an imminent Italian financial disaster, which could have a potentially catastrophic effect on the 17-nation eurozone and the world economy. Many critics of Berlusconi accused him of using his power primarily to protect his own business ventures. Umberto Bossi, leader of Lega Nord, a partner in Berlusconi's right-wing coalition, was quoted as informing reporters outside parliament, "We asked the prime minister to step aside."

On 12 November 2011, after a final meeting with his cabinet, Berlusconi met Italian President Giorgio Napolitano at the Palazzo del Quirinale to tend his resignation. As he arrived at the presidential residence, a hostile crowd gathered with banners insulting Berlusconi and throwing coins at the car. After his resignation, the booing and jeering continued as he left in his convoy, with the public shouting words such as "buffoon", "dictator" and "mafioso". Following Berlusconi's resignation, Mario Monti formed a new government that would remain in office until the next scheduled elections in 2013. On 16 November, Monti announced that he had formed a Cabinet and was sworn in as Prime Minister of Italy, also appointing himself as Minister of Economy and Finances.

In the following years Berlusconi often expressed his point of view regarding his resignation in 2011. He accused Angela Merkel, Nicolas Sarkozy, Christine Lagarde and Giorgio Napolitano, along with other global economic and financial powers, to have plotted against him and forced him to resign, because he refused to accept a loan from the International Monetary Fund, which according to him, would have sold the country to the IMF. This theory was confirmed by the former Prime Minister of Spain José Luis Rodríguez Zapatero.

2013 general election 

In December 2012, Berlusconi announced on television that he would run again to become Prime Minister of Italy. Berlusconi said his party's platform would include opposition to Mario Monti's economic performance, which he said put Italy into a "recessive spiral without end." He also told the media on the sidelines of A.C. Milan's practice session, the football club he owns along with Mediaset, the largest media outlet in the country, that he races to win. He said: "To win, everyone said there had to be a tested leader. It's not that we did not look for one. We did, and how! But there isn't one ... I'm doing it out of a sense of responsibility."

On 7 January 2013, Berlusconi announced he had made a coalition agreement (centre-right coalition) with Lega Nord (LN); as part of it, PdL would support Roberto Maroni's bid for the presidency of Lombardy, and he would run as "leader of the coalition" but suggested he could accept a role as Minister of Economy under a cabinet headed by another People of Freedom (PdL) member, such as Angelino Alfano. Later that day, LN leader Maroni confirmed his party would not support Berlusconi being appointed as Prime Minister in the case of an electoral win. Berlusconi's coalition gained 29.1% of votes and 125 seats in the Chamber of Deputies, 30.7% of votes and 117 seats in the Senate.

In April 2013, Berlusconi's PdL announced his support of the Letta government, together with the Democratic Party and the centrist Civic Choice, of former Prime Minister Mario Monti.

Refoundation of Forza Italia and public office ban 

In June 2013, Berlusconi announced the refoundation of his first party Forza Italia (FI). On 18 September the new party was launched and officially founded on 16 November. After the foundation of Forza Italia, Berlusconi announced that his new party would oppose the grand coalition government of Enrico Letta; the new political position taken by Berlusconi caused dissent in the movement, and the governmental wing of Forza Italia led by Angelino Alfano split from FI and founded a Christian democratic party called New Centre-Right, which supported the Letta Cabinet.

On 1 August 2013, Berlusconi was convicted of tax fraud by the court of final instance, the Supreme Court of Cassation, which confirmed his four-year prison sentence, of which three years are automatically pardoned, along with a public office ban for two years. As his age exceeded 70 years, he was exempted from direct imprisonment; he served his sentence by doing unpaid social community work. Because he was sentenced to a gross imprisonment of more than two years, a new Italian anti-corruption law (named after Paola Severino) resulted in the Senate expelling and barring him from serving in any legislative office for six years. Berlusconi pledged to stay leader of Forza Italia throughout his custodial sentence and public office ban. He was not able to campaign for his party, and according to him this was the main reason for declining opinion poll numbers, which are putting the party steadily in fourth place, behind the Democratic Party, the Five Star Movement and FI's long-time coalition partner Lega Nord.

In March 2017, Berlusconi expressed his intention to run once again as centre-right candidate for the premiership, even if he is banned from public office until 2019; the 2018 Italian general election was his seventh one as the centre-right frontunner. The general election resulted in Lega per Salvini Premier winning more seats than FI, and no electoral coalition winning an outright majority.

Political comeback and election to European Parliament 
In January 2019, Berlusconi expressed his intention to run for candidacy in the 2019 European Parliament election in Italy. In the election, Forza Italia received only 8.8% of votes, the worst result in its history. Berlusconi was elected in the Parliament, becoming the oldest member of the assembly. He was a potential nominee in the 2022 Italian presidential election, which was ultimately won by Sergio Mattarella. From 2019 to 2022, Berlusconi had the lowest attendance rate among MEPs with 59%, largely because of months of dealing with symptoms after catching COVID-19 in September 2020.

Foreign policy 

Berlusconi and his cabinets have had a strong tendency to support American foreign policies, despite the policy divide between the U.S. and many founding members of the European Union like Germany, France, and Belgium during the George W. Bush administration. Under Berlusconi's lead, the Italian Government also shifted its traditional position on foreign policy from being the most pro-Arab Western government,  towards a greater friendship with Israel and Turkey than in the past. This resulted in a rebalancing of relations between all the Mediterranean countries, to reach equal closeness with them. Berlusconi is one of the strongest supporters of Turkey's application to accede to the European Union. To support Turkey's application the Italian Premier invited Prime Minister Erdoğan to take part in a meeting of the European leaders of Denmark, France, Germany, the Netherlands, Spain, Sweden, and the United Kingdom, gathered in L'Aquila for the 2009 G8 summit. Italy, with Berlusconi in office, became a solid ally of the United States due to his support for the war in Afghanistan and the Iraq War following the 2003 invasion of Iraq in the war on terror. On 30 January 2003, Berlusconi signed "The letter of the eight" supporting the U.S. preparations for 2003 invasion of Iraq.

Berlusconi, in his meetings with United Nations Secretary-General Kofi Annan and U.S. President George W. Bush, said that he pushed for "a clear turnaround in the Iraqi situation" and for a quick handover of sovereignty to the government chosen by the Iraqi people. Italy had some 3,200 troops deployed in Southern Iraq, the third largest contingent there after the American and British forces. When Romano Prodi became Prime Minister, Italian troops were gradually withdrawn from Iraq in the second half of 2006 with the last soldiers leaving the country in December of that year.

Relations with Russia 

In November 2007, Italy's state-owned energy company Eni signed an agreement with Russian state-owned Gazprom to build the South Stream pipeline. Investigating Italian parliament members discovered that Central Energy Italian Gas Holding (CEIGH), a part of the Centrex Group, was to play a major role in the lucrative agreement. Bruno Mentasti-Granelli, a close friend of Berlusconi, owned 33 percent of CEIGH. The Italian parliament blocked the contract and accused Berlusconi of having a personal interest in the Eni-Gazprom agreement.

Berlusconi is among the most vocal supporters of closer ties between Russia and the European Union. In an article published in Italian media on 26 May 2002, he said that the next step in Russia's growing integration with the West should be EU membership. On 17 November 2005, Berlusconi commented, in relation to the prospect of such membership, that he is "convinced that even if it is a dream ... it is not too distant a dream and I think it will happen one day." The Prime Minister of Italy has made similar comments on other occasions as well.

Berlusconi had a warm relationship with Vladimir Putin. In September 2014, Berlusconi accused the United States, NATO and EU of "a ridiculously and irresponsibly sanctioning approach to the Russian Federation, which cannot but defend Ukrainian citizens of Russian origin that it considers brothers".

The two leaders often described their relationship as a close friendship, continuing to organize bilateral meetings even after Berlusconi's resignation in November 2011.

Berlusconi condemned the 2022 Russian invasion of Ukraine, saying he was deeply disappointed by the behaviour of Russian President Putin. On the eve of the 2022 Italian general election, he defended the "special military operation" implemented by Russia, adding that Putin just wanted to replace Volodymyr Zelenskyy's government with "decent people". In October 2022, leaked audio recordings revealed Berlusoni expressing dismay at Italy's military support for Ukraine and blamed Volodymyr Zelenskyy for Russian invasion of Ukraine.

Relations with Israel 
Under Berlusconi, Italy was an ally of Israel. Benjamin Netanyahu said of Berlusconi: "We are lucky that there is a leader such as yourself. I don't believe we have a better friend in the international community." Berlusconi has been noted for his close and friendly relationship with Israeli Prime Minister Netanyahu. Netanyahu describes Berlusconi as "one of the greatest friends". Berlusconi believed that Israel should be made an EU member, stating that "My greatest desire, as long as I am a protagonist in politics, is to bring Israel into membership of the European Union". Berlusconi has strongly defended Israel in the Israeli–Palestinian conflict, continuing his support for Israel after leaving office.

While Berlusconi was in office, Israel and Italy negotiated a $1 billion deal whereby Israel builds reconnaissance satellites for Italy, while Israel purchases the M-346 training plane for its air-force.

Relations with Belarus 
Berlusconi visited Alexander Lukashenko in Belarus in 2009. Berlusconi became the first Western leader to visit Lukashenko since Lukashenko came to power in 1994. At a press conference, Berlusconi paid compliments to Lukashenko and said "Good luck to you and your people, whom I know love you".

Cooperation with the Western Balkans 

On 5 April 2009, at the EU-US summit in Prague Berlusconi proposed an eight-point road map to accelerate the Euro-Atlantic integration of the western Balkans. During that summit the Italian Foreign Minister Franco Frattini urged his European colleagues to send "visible and concrete" signs to the countries concerned (Serbia, Kosovo, Bosnia, Montenegro, Croatia, North Macedonia, and Albania).

Relations with Libya 

On 30 August 2008, the Libyan leader Muammar Gaddafi and Italian Prime Minister Berlusconi signed a historic cooperation treaty in Benghazi. Under its terms, Italy would pay $5 billion to Libya as compensation for its former military occupation. In exchange, Libya would take measures to combat illegal immigration coming from its shores and boost investment in Italian companies. The treaty was ratified by the Italian government on 6 February 2009, and by Libya on 2 March, during a visit to Tripoli by Berlusconi. In June Gaddafi made his first visit to Rome, where he met Prime Minister Berlusconi, Italian President of the Republic Giorgio Napolitano and Senate's Speaker Renato Schifani.

In July, Gaddafi took part in the 35th G8 summit in L'Aquila as Chairman of the African Union. During the summit, a warm handshake between the U.S. president Barack Obama and Muammar Gaddafi took place (the first time the Libyan leader had been greeted by a serving US president). Later, at the summit's official dinner hosted by President Giorgio Napolitano, US and Libyan leaders upset protocol by sitting next to Italian Prime Minister and G8 host Berlusconi. (According to protocol, Gaddafi should have sat three places away from Berlusconi).

When Gaddafi faced a civil war in 2011, Italy imposed a freeze on some Libyan assets linked to him and his family, pursuant to a United Nations-sponsored regime and then bombed the country with the violation of Libya of the No-Fly Zone. However, Berlusconi spoke out against military intervention into Libya, saying that he was against getting involved: "I had my hands tied by the vote of the parliament of my country. But I was against and I am against this intervention which will end in a way that no-one knows" and added "This wasn't a popular uprising because Gaddafi was loved by his people, as I was able to see when I went to Libya."

Berlusconism 

Berlusconismo is a term used in Italian media and political analysts to describe the political positions of Berlusconi.

Origins and features 

The term "Berlusconismo" arose in the 1980s, with a strongly positive meaning, as a synonym for entrepreneurial optimism, that is, as an entrepreneurial spirit which is not shaken by difficulties, and believes that problems can be solved. However, in the 21st century, the meaning has changed.

According to the Italian definition given by the online vocabulary of the Encyclopedia Institute, Berlusconismo has a wide range of meanings, all having their origins in the figure of Berlusconi, and the political movement inspired by him: the "thought movement", but also to "social phenomenon", and, even, the phenomenon "of custom" bound to his entrepreneurial and political figure. The term is also used to refer to a certain laissez-faire vision supported by him, not in the economy and markets, but also in relation to politics.

According to Berlusconi's political and entrepreneurial opponents, Berlusconismo is only a form of demagogic populism, comparable to Fascism, in part because Berlusconi has defended aspects of the regime of Benito Mussolini, even though he has criticised the racial Fascist laws and the alliance with Nazi Germany. In 2013, he returned to calling Mussolini a good leader whose biggest mistake was signing up to exterminate the Jews. Contrastingly his supporters compare Berlusconismo to French Gaullism and Argentinian Peronism.

Political positions

Berlusconi defines himself as moderate, liberal, and a free trader, but he is often also described as a populist or a conservative. After his resignation in 2011, Berlusconi has become increasingly Eurosceptic, and he is often critical of German Chancellor Angela Merkel.

One of Berlusconi's main leadership tactics is to use the party as an apparatus to reach power (defined as a "light party", because of a lack of a complex structure). This is decidedly comparable to the political tactics used by Charles De Gaulle in France. Another feature of great importance is emphasis on a "liberal revolution", summarised by the "Contract with the Italians" of 2001. "The strong reformism is added to these pillars, principally on the form of the Italian state and the constitution" including the passage from a Parliamentary Republic to a Presidential one, a higher election threshold, the abolition of Senate, a halving in the number of deputies, the abolition of the provinces and the reform of the judiciary, with separation of the careers between magistrates and magistrates's civil responsibility, from Berlusconi considered impartial. Berlusconi has declared himself to be persecuted by judges, having undergone 34 trials, accusing them of being manipulated by left-wingers and comparing himself to Enzo Tortora, victim of a miscarriage of justice. More recently, Berlusconi has declared himself favourable to civil unions.

Comparisons to other leaders 

A number of writers and political commentators consider Berlusconi's political success a precedent for the 2016 election of real estate tycoon Donald Trump as the 45th President of the United States, with most noting Berlusconi's panned Prime Ministerial tenure and therefore making the comparison in dismay. Roger Cohen of The New York Times argued, "Widely ridiculed, endlessly written about, long unscathed by his evident misogyny and diverse legal travails, Berlusconi proved a Teflon politician ... Nobody who knows Berlusconi and has watched the rise and rise of Donald Trump can fail to be struck by the parallels." The New York Times also published an interactive quiz called "Name That Narcissist", which compiled quotes from both politicians with the reader having to guess whether each one was uttered by Berlusconi or Trump. In The Daily Beast, Barbie Latza Nadeau wrote, "If Americans are wondering just what a Trump presidency would look like, they only need to look at the traumatized remains of Italy after Berlusconi had his way." During the 2016 presidential election, Politico described Berlusconi as the closest parallel to Trump in a historical world leader and that his tenure as Italy's Prime Minister is a good bellwether of what a Trump presidency would be like.

In a piece written for Slate and published in April 2017, Lorenzo Newman noted the similarities in the career trajectories between the two men – "Both grew their fortunes on allegedly mafia-linked real-estate developments, transitioned into successful careers as media moguls, and, against all odds, ascended to the helm of their respective national governments" – but also highlighted their shared tendency to question and undermine established institutions such as the judiciary and the press, the way that neither of them had been accepted by their countries' respective establishments despite their wealth, and how they channelled the resulting resentment into a populist form of politics by "portraying themselves as everymen, if not in wealth, then in language, tone (and) aspirations". He also pointed out other commonalities, such as responding to concerns about conflicts of interest by delegating responsibility for running their businesses to family members.

Andrej Babiš, the current Prime Minister of the Czech Republic has also been compared to Berlusconi due to his media ownership, business activities, political influence and legal problems with a prison sentence hanging over him. An article published by the American magazine Foreign Policy drew parallels between the two, labelling Babiš with the nickname "Babisconi".

British historian Perry Anderson wrote that despite Berlusconi's reputation as an enfant terrible of the European right, his actual policy record places him "to the left of Bill Clinton, who built much of his career in America on policies – delivering executions in Arkansas, scything welfare in Washington – that would be unthinkable for any Prime Minister in Italy.”

Legal problems

Ongoing trials 
As of April 2014, after the Unipol case had been completed with Berlusconi being acquitted due to the statute of limitations, Berlusconi is involved in three ongoing court trials.

Abuse of office – The Unipol case (2005) 
In February 2012, Milan prosecutors brought charges against Berlusconi for alleged abuse of office connected with the publication of confidential wiretaps by the Italian newspaper Il Giornale, which is owned by Berlusconi's brother, in 2005. The publication of the conversations between then Governor of the Bank of Italy Antonio Fazio, senior management of Unipol and Italian centre-left politician Piero Fassino was a breach of secrecy rules and was seen at the time as an attempt to discredit Berlusconi's political rivals. Their publication also eventually led to the collapse of the proposed takeover of Banca Nazionale del Lavoro by Unipol and the resignation of Fazio. The head of the company used by Italian prosecutors to record the conversations has been previously convicted of stealing the recordings and making them available to Berlusconi. On 7 February 2012, at an initial court hearing, Berlusconi denied he had listened to the tapes and ordered their publication. On 7 March 2013, Berlusconi was sentenced to a one-year jail term. On 31 March 2014, the Milan Court of Appeal ruled that whilst the evidence did not clear Paolo and Silvio Berlusconi from guilt, they were both acquitted due to the statutes of limitations, although an €80,000 compensatory award to Fassino was upheld.

Bribery of senators supporting the Prodi government (2006) 
In February 2013, Berlusconi was under investigation for corruption and illegal financing of political parties by the public prosecutor of Naples, in the figures of Vincenzo Piscitelli, Henry John Woodcock, Francesco Curcio, Alessandro Milita and Fabrizio Vanorio. He is accused of bribing in 2006, with €3 million (of which 1 million and 2 million declared to the tax authorities in black), directed to Senator Sergio De Gregorio (the former leader of the Italians in the World party) to facilitate its passage into the ranks of the Berlusconi-led coalition House of Freedoms. Along with Berlusconi, a journalist (Valter Lavitola) at the head of the socialist newspaper L'Avanti! was also investigated, and Sergio De Gregorio self-confessed being the recipient of the bribery.

On 23 October 2013, Berlusconi and Valter Lavitola were both indicted by the judge for preliminary hearings, Amelia Primavera. For Senator De Gregorio the process has already been closed in a preliminary hearing, because he opted to voluntarily confess and bargained a reduced sentence of 20 months in prison for the crime. The court hearing at first-instance for the indicted Berlusconi, has been scheduled to start on 11 February 2014. During the court proceedings, ex-senator Paolo Rossi (a former member of The Olive Tree party) also testified to have been offered a bribe from Berlusconi by another ex-Senator Antonio Tomassini (a former member of the defunct Christian Democrats), to change political sides and join Berlusconi's center-right bloc, so that they together could cause the fall of the Romano Prodi government in 2006–08. According to the prosecutors, Valter Lavitola was also working on behalf of Berlusconi as a go-between attempting to also bribe other senators.

Defamation against Antonio Di Pietro (2008) 
Berlusconi has repeatedly questioned the legitimacy of the legal degree of the former Operation "Clean Hands" magistrate and leader of the Italy of Values party, Antonio Di Pietro, when he during a 2008 election rally and in an episode of the talk show Porta a Porta in March 2008 he repeatedly claimed that Di Pietro had not obtained his degree by passing the exams, but with the aid of the secret services, to have a judge placed in the system to overturn the parties of the so-called First Republic. Di Pietro subsequently sued Berlusconi for aggravated defamation in June 2008. The public prosecutor concluded the preliminary investigation 13 November 2009, by indicting Berlusconi for the defamation offence referred to in Article 595 paragraph 2 of the Criminal Code. The Italian Chamber of Deputies then intervened in the case by passing a decree 22 September 2010, granting all Italian parliamentarians "absolute immunity" for words spoken while elected.

On 5 October 2010, the court in Viterbo ruled that Berlusconi could not be judged or punished, because of the parliamentary immunity enshrined in Article 68 of the Italian constitution forbidding any legal prosecutions against words spoken by parliamentarians in the course of their "exercise of parliamentary duties", in conjunction with the Chamber of Deputies recently having voted for a decree to grant Berlusconi absolute immunity for any spoken words while serving as a deputy. On 19 January 2012, this judgement was set aside by the Supreme Court, which ruled that Berlusconi had been speaking during a campaign rally and not in an institutional setting; meaning he was not covered by the immunity protection provided for by Article 68, and consequently should face a new trial to be held either at the Viterbo court or the Constitutional Court.

On 10 January 2013, the Viterbo court decided to transfer the case for judgement directly to the Constitutional Court. The Constitutional Court ruled on 20 June 2013, that the Chamber of Deputies decree having extended Berlusconi's immunity beyond what was provided for by the constitution, was a case with conflict of powers and should be disregarded. This mean that Berlusconi does not enjoy any special immunity protection for his spoken words during election campaigns, and that a court case now shall be held by the constitutional court, to decide the merits of the case. Before the case against Berlusconi can begin, the Italian Chamber of Deputies however shall be called for trial to defend and explain the reasons for passing their unconstitutional law from 2010. The court hearing against the Chamber of Deputies took place on 8 July 2014, where the constitutional court was asked to deem the concerned Chamber of Deputies decree to be unconstitutional and annul it, by the Court of Rome and the Viterbo court. On 18 July 2014, the Constitutional Court indeed ruled the decree to be unconstitutional and annulled it; meaning that the civil court proceedings against Berlusconi now can continue.

Soliciting minors for sex – Ruby case (2010) 

In February 2011, Berlusconi was charged with paying for sex with nightclub dancer Karima El Mahroug (also known by the stage name Ruby Rubacuori) between February and May 2010, when she was one year below the legal 18 years age-limit for providing sexual services. He was also charged with abusing his political powers in an attempt to cover up the relationship (by trying to persuade the police to release the girl while she was under arrest for theft, based on a false claim that she was a relative of Hosni Mubarak's).

The fast-track trial opened on 6 April and was adjourned until 31 May. El Mahroug's lawyer said that Mahroug would not be attaching herself to the case as a civil complainant and denies that she ever made herself available for money. Another alleged victim, Giorgia Iafrate, also decided not to be a party to the case. In January 2013, judges rejected an application from Berlusconi's lawyers to have the trial adjourned so that it would not interfere with Italy's 2013 general election in which Berlusconi was participating. On 24 June 2013, Berlusconi was found guilty of paying El Mahroug for sex when she was 17 years old, and of abusing his powers in an ensuing cover up. He was sentenced by the Court of First Instance to seven years in jail, and banned from public office for life. In January 2014, Berlusconi deposited an appeal against the judgment, requesting complete absolution. The appeal process began on 20 June. On 18 July 2014, the Italian appeals court announced the appeal had been successful and the convictions against Berlusconi were being overturned. According to the court's published summary of the judgement, Berlusconi was acquitted from the extortion charges (abuse of power) because "the fact does not exist" and from the child prostitution charge because "the fact is not a crime". The more detailed court reasoning for acquittal will be published within 90 days, and the prosecutor stated he would then most likely appeal the decision to the Court of Cassation.

Ongoing investigations
In addition to the ongoing court trials, Berlusconi has been involved in the following two ongoing legal investigations, which evolved to become a court trial if the judge at the preliminary hearing indict him of the alleged crime:
 Ruby ter (2011–13) – corruption in judicial acts (bribing witnesses) in connection with evidence submitted at the main "Ruby case". Allegedly a bribery with €2,500 paid per month for each of the 18 Olgettine girls from Arcore (the girls – including Ruby – participating in the evening events at Berlusconi's residence) to speak in favor of Berlusconi, had been started by his two defending lawyers, Niccolò Ghedini and Piero Longo, in the aftermath of the opened police investigation on 15 January 2011. In addition the Mediaset journalist Silvia Trevaini had allegedly been bribed, not only by the same monthly fee but also by extra gifts equal to €800,000. Finally Ruby, in particular, had been promised by Berlusconi "a huge reward if she would keep quiet or otherwise make him mad", and Ruby had replied she was "waiting for €5 million". On 23 January 2014, the public prosecutor Edmondo Bruti Liberati asked for a legal case to be opened for a preliminary hearing.
 Illegal financing of the political party Italians in the World – on 16 April 2014, the Naples prosecutor deposited new documents in which Berlusconi is under investigation for the crime in recent years of illegal financing of the political party Italians in the World, being led by ex-Senator Sergio De Gregorio. This process was under investigation, with a preliminary hearing to decide if an court indictment shall be filed.

Cases with final convictions 
, Berlusconi has only been convicted by the final appeal instance in 1 out of 32 court cases.

Tax-fraud conviction in Mediaset trial (1988–98) 
The Mediaset trial was launched in April 2005, with indictment of fourteen people (including Berlusconi) for having committed false accounting and embezzlement to mask payments of substantial black funds, committed in 1988–94; and tax fraud equal in total to more than €62 million (120 billion of Italian lire), committed in 1988–98.

Both indictments were related to achievement of personal tax evasion, through illicit trade of movie rights between Mediaset and secret fictive foreign companies situated in tax haven nations, causing fictive losses for Mediaset, with the trade gains being accumulated by the foreign companies owned by the indicted tax fraudsters, who ultimately had the gains paid out as personal profit without paying tax in Italy. In 2007, the court case at first-instance had not yet been launched, and the prosecutors dropped the (A) charges against Berlusconi due to the statute of limitations, and for the same reason the (B) charges were narrowed down to the 1994–98 period, in which the prosecutor charged Berlusconi for having committed a personal tax evasion of €7.3 million.

On 26 October 2012, Berlusconi was sentenced to four years of punishment by an Italian court for tax evasion. The charges were in relation to a scheme to purchase overseas film rights at inflated prices through offshore companies.  The four-year term was longer than the three years and eight months the prosecutors had requested, but was shortened to one year in accord with a 2006 amnesty law intended to reduce prison overcrowding. Berlusconi and his co-defendants were also ordered to pay a 10 million euro fine and were banned from holding public office for three years.

On 8 May 2013, the Court of Appeals in Milan confirmed the four-year prison sentence, and extended the public office ban to five years. On 1 August 2013, the Court of Cassation (final appeal) confirmed the sentence of 4 years, of which the last three years are automatically pardoned. The decision marked the first time that Berlusconi received a definitive sentence, despite being on trial nearly 30 times during the last 25 years. In regards of calculating the exact length of the public office ban, the Court of Cassation asked the lower court to re-judge this, because of prosecutors having presented new legal arguments for the ban to be reduced from five to three years. The ramification of his public office ban is that it makes him ineligible to serve any public office but technically he would still be allowed as a non-candidate to continue leading his party and centre-right coalition in election campaigns. A similar situation occurred in March 2013, when the leader of the Five Star Movement, Beppe Grillo, convicted over a road accident in 1988, led his party's 2013 election campaign despite not being able to run for public office because of a rule established within his movement.

Due to being over 70 years of age, Berlusconi was not placed direct in prison but could decide if he wanted to serve his one-year jail term either by a house arrest at one of his private residences or by doing community service. As the gross prison term exceeds two years, the Severino law prompted the Senate to vote if Berlusconi shall be forced to resign his current senate seat immediately, or alternatively allowing the court imposed ban on holding public office only to take effect by the end of his current legislative term. The pending senate vote, combined with anger over Berlusconi's conviction (a poll indicated 42% of the public believe he has been unfairly persecuted by the magistrates) presented a serious political challenge for the fragile ruling coalition. On 3 August, Berlusconi suggested that unless a solution to his predicament could be found, Italy was at "risk of a civil war". The following day, thousands of supporters gathered in front of his house in protest of the ruling.

On 30 August, Italian President Giorgio Napolitano announced he had not selected Berlusconi as one of the new four lifetime senators, which are granted the privileges of being a lawmaker for life with some protected legal immunity, meaning they can continue working in politics even after being convicted guilty for criminal offences that otherwise would lead to ban from serving one of the public offices. On 9 September, a Senate committee began its deliberations to decide if Berlusconi's public office ban shall start immediately or by the end of his current legislative term. Before the committee decision becomes effective, it also needed to be approved by a vote in the full Senate.

The deliberations of the Senate committee lasted for several weeks before they reach a decision. According to the Severino law, which became enacted by the Monti government in December 2012, anyone sentenced to more than two years in prison is deemed ineligible to hold public office for a period of six years, or eight years if convicted for abuse of power, and should immediately be expelled from the parliament. Berlusconi argued that the Severino law can not be used to expel persons convicted for crimes committed before December 2012, and pleaded for the proceedings to be postponed until the European Court of Human Rights or the Constitutional Court of Italy had ruled, whether or not he was correct about his interpretation of the law. Berlusconi also stated that he in any case had decided to appeal the court ruling against him to the European Court of Human Rights, as he still claimed the ruling itself to be a political and unjust attempt by his opponents, to deprive him of his political power. The response by Prime Minister Enrico Letta's centre-left Democratic Party was to reject Berlusconi's plea, accusing him of only launching time-wasting maneuvers. Berlusconi's PDL party then made a threat to withdraw their support for the government if the Senate committee expelled Berlusconi as senator. The Democratic Party replied by warning the PDL that they would reject any blackmail attempts, and in any case only would vote in the Senate committee according to the standard of the Italian law. Ahead of the Senate committee's voting, the leading criminal lawyer Paola Severino, who helped design the Severino law, stated to la Repubblica that this specific law in her professional opinion also applied for crimes being committed before its enactment in December 2012.

On 10 September, at the second day of the Senate deliberations, the Democratic Party stated they intended to vote down all three PDL submitted motions to delay the Senate deliberations, and accused PDL of obstructing the work of the Senate committee by playing delaying tactics. Renato Brunetta, floor leader of the PDL in the lower house, responded by saying: "If the Democratic Party and Grillo's people decide this evening to vote against the proposals, the Democratic Party will bring down the Letta government." The meeting at the second day ended with PDL agreeing to drop their series of technical objections to try to halt the hearings, on the agreement that each of the committee members could speak at greater length in a broad discussion on the merits of the case. On 18 September, Berlusconi made a national televised speech, in which he pledged to stay as party leader of a revived Forza Italia, no matter if the Senate would end up deciding to expel him or not. On 25 September, the PDL parliamentary group agreed on a resolution to threaten the Senate, that if Berlusconi would be expelled, then all PDL parliamentarians would immediately "reflect on and decide according to his or her conscience", whether or not to show sympathy with Berlusconi by resigning their own seats in the Senate. The Senate Committee nevertheless voted 15:8 in support for a recommendation to expel Berlusconi on 4 October, and ten days later submitted a final report about the case so that it can be scheduled for a final vote in the full Senate by early November. The Rules of Procedure Committee decided at its meeting on 30 October, by the votes 7:6, that Berlusconi's expulsion vote shall not be conducted as a secret vote but as an open public vote. On 27 November 2013, the Senate voted 192:113 for enforcement of Berlusconi's immediate expulsion and a six-year ban from serving any legislative office.

Berlusconi was expected to start serving his four-year prison sentence (reduced to one year), either under house arrest or doing unpaid social community work, in mid-October 2013. In mid-October, he informed the court that he preferred to serve the sentence by doing community service. Because of bureaucracy in the legal court system, it was however expected his one-year-long full-time community service would only start in around April 2014. On 19 October, the Milan appeal court ruled that Berlusconi's public office ban should be reduced from five to two years; which was later also confirmed by the Court of Cassation. The court imposed this public office ban, which did not change the fact that, according to the Severino law, Berlusconi received a ban preventing him from running as a candidate in legislative elections for a prolonged six-year period, which effectively superseded the shorter court imposed public office ban. Berlusconi began his community service at a Catholic care home centre on 9 May 2014, where he is required to work four hours a week for a year with elderly dementia patients.

As of 2017, Berlusconi's appeal regarding his six-year public office ban was pending before the European Court of Human Rights.

Controversies 

Berlusconi has been involved in many controversies and over 20 court cases during his political career, including being sentenced to four years imprisonment and a five-year ban from public office by the Court of Appeals for €7M tax evasion (and €280M slush fund) on 8 May 2013, confirmed by the Court of Cassation on 1 August 2013. Due to a general pardon, his imprisonment was reduced to one year, which due to his age can be served either as a house arrest at his private residence or as community service.

On 24 June 2013, Berlusconi was found guilty of paying an underage prostitute for sex, and of abusing his powers in an ensuing cover up. He was sentenced to seven years in jail, and banned from public office for life. He was acquitted from the sex charges by the Italy appeals court on Friday, 18 July 2014.

Economic conflicts of interest 
According to journalists Marco Travaglio and Enzo Biagi, Berlusconi entered politics to save his companies from bankruptcy and himself from convictions. From the very beginning he said it clearly to his associates. Berlusconi's supporters hailed him as the "novus homo", an outsider who was going to bring a new efficiency to the public bureaucracy and reform the state from top to bottom.

Berlusconi was investigated for forty different inquests in less than two years.

Berlusconi's governments passed laws that shortened statutory terms for tax fraud. Romano Prodi, who defeated Berlusconi in 2006, claimed that these were ad personam laws, meant to solve Berlusconi's problems and defend his interests.

Media control and conflict of interest 

Berlusconi's extensive control over the media has been widely criticised by some analysts, some press freedom organisations, and extensively by several Italian newspapers, national and private TV channels, by opposition leaders and in general members of opposition parties, who allege that Italy's media has limited freedom of expression. However such coverage of the complaint in practice put under discussion the point of the complaint itself. The Freedom of the Press 2004 Global Survey, an annual study issued by the American organisation Freedom House, downgraded Italy's ranking from 'Free' to 'Partly Free' due to Berlusconi's influence over RAI, a ranking which, in "Western Europe" was shared only with Turkey. Reporters Without Borders states that in 2004, "The conflict of interests involving Prime Minister Berlusconi and his vast media empire was still not resolved and continued to threaten news diversity". In April 2004, the International Federation of Journalists joined the criticism, objecting to the passage of a law vetoed by Carlo Azeglio Ciampi in 2003, which critics believe is designed to protect Berlusconi's reported 90% control of the Italian national media.

Berlusconi owns via Mediaset 3 of 7 national TV channels: (Canale 5, Italia 1, and Rete 4). In 2002, Luciano Violante, a prominent member of the Left, said in a speech in Parliament: "Honourable Anedda, I invite you to ask the honourable Berlusconi, because he certainly knows that he received a full guarantee in 1994, when the government changed—that TV stations would not be touched. He knows it and the Honourable Letta knows it." The authors of the book Inciucio cite this sentence as evidence for the idea that the Left made a deal with Berlusconi in 1994, in which a promise was made not to honour a law in the Constitutional Court of Italy that would have required Berlusconi to give up one of his three TV channels to uphold pluralism and competition. According to the authors, this would be an explanation of why the Left, despite having won the 1996 elections, did not pass a law to solve the conflicts of interest between media ownership and politics.

Berlusconi's influence over RAI became evident when in Sofia, Bulgaria he expressed his views on journalists Enzo Biagi and Michele Santoro, and comedian Daniele Luttazzi. Berlusconi said that they "use television as a criminal means of communication". They lost their jobs as a result. This statement was called by critics "Editto Bulgaro".

The TV broadcasting of a satirical programme called RAIot was censored in November 2003 after the comedian Sabina Guzzanti made outspoken criticism of the Berlusconi media empire. Mediaset, one of Berlusconi's companies, sued RAI over Guzzanti's program, demanding 20 million euros for "damages"; in November 2003 the show was cancelled by the president of RAI, Lucia Annunziata. The details of the event were made into a Michael Moore-style documentary called Viva Zapatero!, which was produced by Guzzanti.

Mediaset, Berlusconi's television group, has stated that it uses the same criteria as the public (state-owned) television RAI in assigning a proper visibility to all the most important political parties and movements (the so-called 'Par Condicio') – which has been since often disproved. In March 2006, on the television channel Rai Tre, in a television interview with Lucia Annunziata during her talk show, In 1/2 h, he stormed out of the studio because of a disagreement with the host regarding the economic consequences of his government. In November 2007, allegations of news manipulation caused the departure from RAI of Berlusconi's personal assistant.

Enrico Mentana, the news anchor long seen as a guarantor of Canale 5's independence, walked out in April 2008, saying that he no longer felt "at home in a group that seems like an electoral campaign committee".

On 24 June 2009, Berlusconi during the Confindustria young members congress in Santa Margherita Ligure, Italy has invited the advertisers to interrupt or boycott the advertising contracts with the magazines and newspapers published by Gruppo Editoriale L'Espresso, in particular la Repubblica and the newsmagazine L'espresso, calling the publishing group "shameless", claiming that it was fuelling the economic crisis by discussing it extensively and accusing it of making a "subversive attack" against him. The publishing group announced it would begin legal proceedings against Berlusconi, given the "criminal and civil relevance" of his remarks.

On 12 October 2009, Berlusconi during the Confindustria Monza and Brianza members' congress, again invited the industrialists present to join a "widespread rebellion" against a "newspaper that hadn't any limits in discrediting the government and the country and indoctrinating foreign newspapers".

In October 2009, Reporters Without Borders secretary-general Jean-François Julliard declared that Berlusconi "is on the verge of being added to our list of Predators of Press Freedom", which would be a first for a European leader. He also added that Italy will probably be ranked last in the European Union in the upcoming edition of the RWB press freedom index.

The Economist 
One of Berlusconi's strongest critics in the media outside Italy is the British weekly The Economist (nicknamed "The Ecommunist" by Berlusconi, despite the magazine's association with market liberalism), which in its issue of 26 April 2001 carried a title on its front cover, 'Why Silvio Berlusconi is unfit to lead Italy'. The war of words between Berlusconi and The Economist has gained notoriety, with Berlusconi taking the publication to court in Rome and The Economist publishing letters against him. The magazine claimed that the documentation contained in its article proves that Berlusconi is 'unfit' for office because of his numerous conflicts of interest. Berlusconi claimed the article contained "a series of old accusations" that was an "insult to truth and intelligence".

According to The Economist findings, Berlusconi, while Prime Minister of Italy, retained in effective control of 90% of all national television broadcasting. This figure included stations he owns directly as well as those over which he had indirect control by dint of his position as Prime Minister and his ability to influence the choice of the management bodies of these stations. The Economist has also claimed that the Italian Prime Minister is corrupt and self-serving. A key journalist for The Economist, David Lane, has set out many of these charges in his book Berlusconi's Shadow.

Lane points out that Berlusconi has not defended himself in court against the main charges, but has relied upon political and legal manipulations, most notably by changing the statute of limitation to prevent charges being completed in the first place. To publicly prove the truth of the documented accusations contained in their articles, the magazine has publicly challenged Berlusconi to sue The Economist for libel. Berlusconi did so, losing versus The Economist, and being charged for all the trial costs on 5 September 2008, when the Court in Milan issued a judgment rejecting all Mr Berlusconi's claims and sentenced him to compensate for The Economists legal expenses.

In June 2011, The Economist published a strong article dealing with Mr. Berlusconi, titled "The man who screwed an entire country".

Legislative changes 

On some occasions, laws passed by the Berlusconi administration have effectively delayed ongoing trials involving him. For example, the law reducing punishment for all cases of false accounting and the law on legitimate suspicion, which allowed defendants to request their cases to be moved to another court if they believe that the local judges are biased against them. Because of these legislative actions, political opponents accuse Berlusconi of passing these laws for the purpose of protecting himself from legal charges. La Repubblica, for example, sustained that Berlusconi passed 17 different laws which have advantaged himself. Berlusconi and his allies, on the other hand, maintain that such laws are consistent with everyone's right to a rapid and just trial, and with the principle of "presumption of innocence" (garantismo); furthermore, they claim that Berlusconi is being subjected to a political "witch hunt", orchestrated by certain (allegedly left-wing) judges.

Berlusconi and his government quarrelled with the Italian judiciary often. His administration attempted to pass a judicial reform intended to limit the flexibility of judges and magistrates in their decision-making.  Critics said it would instead limit the magistracy's independence by de facto subjecting the judiciary to the executive's control. The reform was met by almost unanimous dissent from the Italian judges, but was passed by the Italian parliament in December 2004.  It was vetoed by the Italian President, Carlo Azeglio Ciampi.

During the night hours between 5 and 6 March 2010, the Berlusconi-led Italian government passed a decree "interpreting" the electoral law to let the PDL candidate run for governor in Lazio after she had failed to properly register for the elections. The Italian Constitution states that electoral procedures can only be changed in Parliament, and must not be changed by governmental decree. Italy's president, whose endorsement of the decree was required by law, said that the measure taken by the government may not violate the Constitution.

Accusations of links to the Mafia

Berlusconi has never been tried on charges relating to the Sicilian Mafia, although several Mafia turncoats have stated that Berlusconi had connections with the Sicilian criminal association. The claims arise mostly from the hiring of Vittorio Mangano, who was accused of being a mafioso, as a gardener and stable-man at Berlusconi's Villa San Martino in Arcore, a small town near Milan. It was Berlusconi's friend Marcello Dell'Utri who introduced Mangano to Berlusconi in 1973. Berlusconi denied any ties to the Mafia. Marcello Dell'Utri even stated that the Mafia did not exist at all.

In 2004, Dell'Utri, co-founder of Forza Italia, was sentenced to nine years by a Palermo court on charge of "external association to the Mafia", a sentence describing Dell'Utri as a mediator between the economic interests of Berlusconi and members of the criminal organisation. Berlusconi refused to comment on the sentence. In 2010, Palermo's appeals court cut the sentence to seven years but fully confirmed Dell'Utri's role as a link between Berlusconi and the Mafia until 1992.

In 1996, a Mafia informer, Salvatore Cancemi, declared that Berlusconi and Dell'Utri were in direct contact with Salvatore Riina, head of the Sicilian Mafia in the 1980s and 1990s. Cancemi disclosed that Fininvest, through Marcello Dell'Utri and mafioso Vittorio Mangano, had paid Cosa Nostra 200 million lire (between 100,000 and 200,000 of today's euro) annually. The alleged contacts, according to Cancemi, were to lead to legislation favourable to Cosa Nostra, in particular reforming the harsh 41-bis prison regime. The underlying premise was that Cosa Nostra would support Berlusconi's Forza Italia party in return for political favours. After a two-year investigation, magistrates closed the inquiry without charges. They did not find evidence to corroborate Cancemi's allegations. Similarly, a two-year investigation, also launched on evidence from Cancemi, into Berlusconi's alleged association with the Mafia was closed in 1996.

According to yet another Mafia turncoat, Antonino Giuffrè – arrested on 16 April 2002 – the Mafia turned to Berlusconi's Forza Italia party to look after the Mafia's interests, after the decline in the early 1990s of the ruling Christian Democratic party, whose leaders in Sicily looked after the Mafia's interests in Rome. The Mafia's fall out with the Christian Democrats became clear when Salvo Lima was killed in March 1992. "The Lima murder marked the end of an era," Giuffrè told the court. "A new era opened with a new political force on the horizon which provided the guarantees that the Christian Democrats were no longer able to deliver. To be clear, that party was Forza Italia." Dell'Utri was the go-between on a range of legislative efforts to ease pressure on mafiosi in exchange for electoral support, according to Giuffrè. "Dell'Utri was very close to Cosa Nostra and a very good contact point for Berlusconi," he said. Mafia boss Bernardo Provenzano told Giuffrè that they "were in good hands" with Dell'Utri, who was a "serious and trustworthy person". Provenzano stated that the Mafia's judicial problems would be resolved within 10 years of 1992, thanks to the undertakings given by Forza Italia.

Giuffrè also said that Berlusconi himself used to be in touch with Stefano Bontade, a top Mafia boss, in the mid-1970s. At the time Berlusconi still was just a wealthy real estate developer and started his private television empire. Bontade visited Berlusconi's villa in Arcore through his contact Vittorio Mangano. Berlusconi's lawyer dismissed Giuffrè's testimony as "false" and an attempt to discredit the Prime Minister and his party. Giuffrè said that other Mafia representatives who were in contact with Berlusconi included the Palermo Mafia bosses Filippo Graviano and Giuseppe Graviano. The Graviano brothers allegedly dealt directly with Berlusconi through the businessman Gianni Letta, somewhere between September/October 1993. The alleged pact with the Mafia fell apart in 2002. Cosa Nostra had achieved nothing.

Dell'Utri's lawyer, Enrico Trantino, dismissed Giuffrè's allegations as an "anthology of hearsay". He said Giuffrè had perpetuated the trend that every new turncoat would attack Dell'Utri and the former Christian Democrat prime minister Giulio Andreotti to earn money and judicial privileges.

In October 2009, Gaspare Spatuzza, a Mafioso turncoat in 2008, has confirmed Giuffrè statements. Spatuzza testified that his boss Giuseppe Graviano had told him in 1994, that Berlusconi was bargaining with the Mafia, concerning a political-electoral agreement between Cosa Nostra and Berlusconi's Forza Italia. Spatuzza said Graviano disclosed the information to him during a conversation in a bar Graviano owned in the upscale Via Veneto district of the Italian capital Rome. Dell'Utri was the intermediary, according to Spatuzza. Dell'Utri has dismissed Spatuzza's allegations as "nonsense". Berlusconi's lawyer and MP for the PdL, Niccolò Ghedini said that "the statements given by Spatuzza about prime minister Berlusconi are baseless and can be in no way verified."

Remarks on Western civilisation and Islam 

After the 11 September 2001 attacks in New York City, Berlusconi said: "We must be aware of the superiority of our civilisation, a system that has guaranteed well-being, respect for human rights and – in contrast with Islamic countries – respect for religious and political rights, a system that has as its value understanding of diversity and tolerance." This declaration caused an uproar, not only in the Arab and Muslim world, but also all around Europe, including Italy. Subsequently, Berlusconi told the press: "We are aware of the crucial role of moderate Arab countries... I am sorry that words that have been misunderstood have offended the sensitivity of my Arab and Muslim friends."

Right-to-die case
After the family of Eluana Englaro (who had been comatose for 17 years) succeeded in having her right to die recognized by the judges and getting doctors to start the process of allowing her to die in the way established by the court, Berlusconi issued a decree to stop the doctor from letting her die. Stating that, "This is murder. I would be failing to rescue her. I'm not a Pontius Pilate". Berlusconi went on to defend his decision by claiming that she was "in the condition to have babies", arguing that comatose women were still subject to menstruation.

Anti-immigration laws 

During his long career as Prime Minister, Berlusconi has had to deal with massive immigration from the coast of North Africa. To limit illegal immigration, the Berlusconi's government promulgated the Bossi-Fini law in 2002. This law took the name by the leaders of the two right-wing allied parties in Berlusconi's government coalition, Umberto Bossi of Lega Nord and Gianfranco Fini of National Alliance.

The law provides the expulsion, issued by the Prefect of the Province where an illegal foreign immigrant is found, and is immediately performed with the assistance at the border of the police. Illegal immigrants without valid identity documents, are taken to detention centers, set up by the Turco-Napolitano law, to be identified. The law provides for the issuance of residence permits to persons who provide proof of having a job for their maintenance budget. To this general rule you add the special residence permits and those in the application of the right to asylum.

The standard allows the repatriation to the country of origin on the high seas, on the basis of bilateral agreements between Italy and neighboring countries, which commit the police forces of their respective countries to cooperate in the prevention of illegal immigration. If the illegal immigrant ships dock on Italian soil, the identification of those entitled to political asylum and the supply of medical treatment and care is undertaken by the marine police force. The law had been severely criticised by the centre-left opposition.

In 2013, the European Parliament asked Italy to modify the Bossi-Fini law because it was too restrictive and severe.

Jokes, gestures, and blunders 

Berlusconi has developed a reputation for making gaffes or insensitive remarks.

On 2 July 2003, Berlusconi suggested that German Social democratic MEP Martin Schulz, who had criticised his domestic policies, should play a Nazi concentration camp guard in a film. Berlusconi insisted that he was joking, but accused Schulz and others to be "bad-willing tourists of democracy". This incident caused a brief cooling of Italy's relationship with Germany.

Addressing traders at the New York Stock Exchange in September 2003, Berlusconi listed a series of reasons to invest in Italy, the first of which was that "we have the most beautiful secretaries in the world". This remark resulted in remonstration among female members of parliament, who took part in a one-day cross-party protest. Berlusconi's list also included the claim that Italy had "fewer communists, and those who are still here deny having been one".

In 2003, during an interview with Nicholas Farrell, then editor of The Spectator, Berlusconi claimed that Mussolini "had been a benign dictator who did not murder opponents but sent them 'on holiday. In 2013, he returned to calling Mussolini a good leader whose biggest mistake was signing up to exterminate the Jews.

Berlusconi had made disparaging remarks about Finnish cuisine during negotiations to decide on the location of the European Food Safety Authority in 2001. He caused further offence in 2005, when he claimed that during the negotiations he had had to "dust off his playboy charms" to persuade the Finnish president, Tarja Halonen, to concede that the EFSA should be based in Parma instead of Finland, and compared Finnish smoked reindeer unfavourably to culatello. The Italian ambassador in Helsinki was summoned by the Finnish foreign minister. One of Berlusconi's ministers later 'explained' the comment by saying that "anyone who had seen a picture of Halonen must have been aware that he had been joking". Halonen took the incident in good humour, retorting that Berlusconi had "overestimated his persuasion skills". The Finnish pizza chain Kotipizza responded by launching a variety of pizza called Pizza Berlusconi, using smoked reindeer as the topping. The pizza won first prize in America's Plate International pizza contest in March 2008.

In March 2006, Berlusconi alleged that Chinese communists under Mao Zedong had "boiled [children] to fertilise the fields". His opponent Romano Prodi criticised Berlusconi for offending the Chinese people and called his comments 'unthinkable'.

In the run-up to the 2008 Italian general election, Berlusconi was accused of sexism for saying that female politicians from the right were "more beautiful" and that "the left has no taste, even when it comes to women". In 2008 Berlusconi criticised the composition of the Council of Ministers of the Spanish Government as being too 'pink' by virtue of the fact that it had (once the President of the Council, José Luis Rodríguez Zapatero, is counted) an equal number of men and women. He also stated that he doubted that such a composition would be possible in Italy given the "prevalence of men" in Italian politics.

Also in 2008, Berlusconi caused controversy at a joint press conference with Russian president Vladimir Putin. When a journalist from the Russian paper Nezavisimaya Gazeta asked a question about Mr. Putin's personal relationships, Berlusconi made a gesture towards the journalist imitating a gunman shooting.

On 6 November 2008, two days after Barack Obama was elected the first black US president, Berlusconi referred to Obama as "young, handsome and even tanned": On 26 March 2009 he said "I'm paler [than Mr. Obama], because it's been so long since I went sunbathing. He's more handsome, younger and taller."

On 24 January 2009, Berlusconi announced his aim to increase the numbers of military patrolling the Italian cities from 3,000 to 30,000 to crack down on what he called an "evil army" of criminals. Responding to a female journalist who asked him if this tenfold increase in patrolling soldiers would be enough to secure Italian women from being raped, he said: "We could not field a big enough force to avoid this risk [of rape]. We would need as many soldiers as beautiful women and I don't think that would be possible, because our women are so beautiful." Opposition leaders called the remarks insensitive and in bad taste. Berlusconi retorted that he had merely wanted to compliment Italian women. Other critics accused him of creating a police state.

Two days after the 2009 L'Aquila earthquake, Berlusconi suggested that people left homeless should view their experience as a camping weekend.

Subsequently, at a tent camp on the outskirts of L'Aquila housing some of the more than 30,000 people who lost their homes during the 2009 earthquake he said to an African priest: "you have a nice tan."

In October 2010, Berlusconi was chastised by the Vatican newspaper L'Osservatore Romano after he was filmed telling "offensive and deplorable jokes", including one whose punchline was similar to one of the gravest blasphemies in the Italian language. It was also revealed he had made another antisemitic joke a few days previously. Berlusconi responded to the allegations by saying the jokes were "neither an offence nor a sin, but merely a laugh".

On 1 November 2010, after once again being accused of involvement in juvenile prostitution, he suggested that an audience at the Milan trade fair should stop reading newspapers: "Don't read newspapers any more because they deceive you. ... I am a man who works hard all day long and if sometimes I look at some good-looking girl, it's better to be fond of pretty girls than to be gay." The remarks were immediately condemned by Arcigay, Italy's main gay rights organisation.

On 13 July 2011, according to a leaked telephone surveillance transcript, Berlusconi told his presumed blackmailer Valter Lavitola: "The only thing they can say about me is that I screw around ... Now they're spying on me, controlling my phone calls. I don't give a fuck. In a few months ... I'll be leaving this shit country that makes me sick."

On 27 January 2013, on the occasion of the Holocaust Remembrance Day, Berlusconi said the Italian fascist dictator Benito Mussolini, except for passing anti-Jewish laws in 1938, only had done "good things" for Italy; and also said Mussolini from a strategic point of view did the right thing in siding with Adolf Hitler during World War II, because Hitler at the point of time when the alliance was made had appeared to be winning the war.

Friendship with Bettino Craxi 
Berlusconi's career as an entrepreneur is also often questioned by his detractors. The allegations made against him generally include suspicions about the extremely rapid increase of his activity in the construction industry in the years 1961–63, hinting at the possibility that in those years he received money from unknown and possibly illegal sources. These accusations are regarded by Berlusconi and his supporters as empty slander, trying to undermine Berlusconi's reputation as a self-made man. Also frequently cited by opponents are events dating to the 1980s, including supposed "exchanges of favours" between Berlusconi and Bettino Craxi, the former Socialist prime minister and leader of the Italian Socialist Party convicted in 1994, for various corruption charges. The Milan magistrates who indicted and successfully convicted Mr. Craxi in their "Clean Hands" investigation laid bare an entrenched system in which businessmen paid hundreds of millions of dollars to political parties or individual politicians in exchange for sweetheart deals with Italian state companies and the government itself. Berlusconi acknowledges a personal friendship with Craxi.

Freedom Army 
On 28 May 2013, Berlusconi and his entourage launched an online initiative which consisted of the recruitment of volunteers, who are available to defend Berlusconi from the convictions of Milan's prosecutors, who were dealing with his trials, and whom Berlusconi often accused of being communists and anti-democratic.

Simone Furlan, the creator of the Freedom Army, said in an interview: "There comes a time in life, when you realize that fighting for an ideal is no longer a choice but an obligation. We civil society we were helpless spectators of the 'War of the Twenty Years' which saw Berlusconi fight and defend against slanderous accusations of all kinds, the result of a judicial persecution without precedent in history." This initiative, launched as Freedom Army, has been immediately nicknamed "Silvio's Army" by the media, and was condemned by the Democratic Party, the Five Star Movement and Left Ecology Freedom.

Wiretaps and accusations of corruption 
In December 2007, the audio recording of a phone call between Berlusconi, then leader of the opposition, and Agostino Saccà (general director of RAI) were published by the magazine L'Espresso and caused a scandal in the media. The wiretap was part of an investigation by the Public Prosecutor Office of Naples, where Berlusconi was investigated for corruption.

In the phone call, Saccà expresses words of impassioned political support to Berlusconi and criticises the behaviour of Berlusconi's allies. Berlusconi urges Saccà to broadcast a telefilm series which was strongly advocated by his ally Umberto Bossi. Saccà laments that many people have spread rumours on this agreement causing problems to him. Then Berlusconi asks Saccà to find a job in RAI for a young woman explicitly telling him that this woman would serve as an asset in a secret exchange with a senator of the majority who would help him to cause Prodi, with his administration, to fall. After the publication of these wiretaps, Berlusconi has been accused by other politicians and by some journalists of political corruption through the exploitation of prostitution. In his own defence, Berlusconi said: "In the entertainment world everybody knows that, in certain situations in RAI TV you work only if you prostitute yourself or if you are leftist. I have intervened on behalf of some personalities who are not leftists and have been completely set apart by RAI TV." In the State Department's 2011 Trafficking in Persons report authorized by U.S. Secretary of State Hillary Clinton, Berlusconi was explicitly named as a person involved in the "commercial sexual exploitation of a Moroccan child".

Divorce and allegations of sexual misconduct 

At the end of April 2009, Berlusconi's wife Veronica Lario, who would divorce him several years later, wrote an open letter expressing her anger at Berlusconi's choice of young, attractive female candidates—some with little or no political experience—to represent the party in the 2009 European Parliament elections. Berlusconi demanded a public apology, claiming that for the third time his wife had "done this to me in the middle of an election campaign", and stated that there was little prospect of his marriage continuing. On 3 May, Lario announced she was filing for divorce. She claimed that Berlusconi had not attended his own sons' 18th birthday parties, and that she "cannot remain with a man who consorts with minors" and "is not well".

Noemi Letizia, the girl in question, gave interviews to the Italian press, revealing that she calls Berlusconi papi (daddy), that they often spent time together in the past, and that Berlusconi would take care of her career as showgirl or politician, whichever she opted to pursue. Berlusconi claimed that he knew Letizia only through her father and that he never met her alone without her parents.

On 14 May, la Repubblica published an article alleging many inconsistencies in Berlusconi's story and asked him to answer ten questions to clarify the situation.

Ten days later, Letizia's ex-boyfriend, Luigi Flaminio, claimed that Berlusconi had contacted Letizia personally in October 2008 and said she had spent a week without her parents at Berlusconi's Sardinian villa around New Year's Eve 2009, a fact confirmed later by her mother. On 28 May 2009, Berlusconi said that he had never had "spicy" relations with Letizia, and said that if any such thing had occurred, he would have resigned immediately.

On 17 June 2009, Patrizia D'Addario, a 42-year-old escort and retired actress from Bari, Italy, claimed that she had been recruited twice to spend the evening with Berlusconi. Berlusconi denied any knowledge of D'Addario being a paid escort: "I have never paid a woman... I have never understood what satisfaction there is if the pleasure of conquest is absent". He also accused an unspecified person of manoeuvring and bribing D'Addario.

On 26 June 2009, the "ten questions" to Berlusconi were reformulated by la Repubblica, and subsequently republished multiple times. On 28 August 2009, Berlusconi sued Gruppo Editoriale L'Espresso, the owner company of the newspaper, and classified the ten questions as "defamatory" and "rhetorical".

Berlusconi's lifestyle has raised eyebrows in Catholic circles, with vigorous criticism being expressed in particular by Avvenire, owned by the Episcopal Conference of Italy. This was followed by the publication in the newspaper il Giornale (owned by the Berlusconi family) of details with regard to legal proceedings against the editor of Avvenire, Dino Boffo, which seemed to implicate him for a harassment case against the wife of his ex-partner. Dino Boffo has always declared the details of the proceedings to be false, although he has not denied the basic premise.

After a period of tense exchanges and polemics, Boffo resigned from his editorial position on 3 September 2009, and the assistant editor Marco Tarquinio became editor ad interim.

On 22 September 2009, after a press conference, Berlusconi declared that he had asked his ministers not to respond anymore to questions regarding "gossip". He stated also that the Italian press should talk only about the "successes" of Italian Government in internal and foreign policies, adding also that the press now will be able only to ask questions relating to his administration and not to gossip.

During a contested episode of AnnoZero on 1 October 2009, the journalist and presenter Michele Santoro interviewed Patrizia D'Addario. She stated she was contacted by Giampaolo Tarantini – a businessman from Bari – who already knew her and requested her presence at Palazzo Grazioli with "the President". D'Addario also stated that Berlusconi knew that she was a paid escort.

Shots of Porto Rotondo 
The attention of the newspapers was later attracted by numerous photos that the photographer Antonello Zappadu had taken on several occasions; some document a vacation in May 2008 in Berlusconi's summer residence in Porto Rotondo, where Czech Prime Minister Mirek Topolánek appears in an Adamic dress, and during the party young girls in bikinis or topless. On 5 June 2009, El País published 5 of the 700 photos of the party. On recommendations from Berlusconi, the Rome Prosecutor's Office seized the photographic material for violation of privacy.

Rubygate 

In November 2010, 17-year-old Moroccan belly dancer and alleged prostitute Karima El Mahroug, better known as Ruby Rubacuori, claimed to have been given $10,000 by Berlusconi at parties at his private villas. The girl told prosecutors in Milan that these events were like orgies where Berlusconi and 20 young women performed an African-style ritual known as the "bunga bunga" in the nude.

It was also found out that, on 27 May 2010, El Mahroug had been arrested for theft by the Milan police but (being still a minor) she was directed to a shelter for juvenile offenders. After a couple of hours, while she was being questioned, Berlusconi, who was at the time in Paris, called the head of the police in Milan and pressured for her release, claiming the girl was related to Hosni Mubarak, then President of Egypt, and that to avoid a diplomatic crisis, she was to be brought to the custody of Nicole Minetti.  Following repeated telephone calls by Berlusconi to the police authorities, El Mahroug was eventually released and entrusted to Minetti's care.

The investigation of Berlusconi for extortion (concussione) and child prostitution regarding Karima El Mahroug has been referred to as "Rubygate".

MP Gaetano Pecorella proposed to lower the age of majority in Italy to solve the case. Minetti was known for previous associations with Berlusconi, having danced for Colorado Cafe, a show on one of Berlusconi's TV channels, and on Scorie, an Italian version of Candid Camera. In November 2009 she became a dental hygienist, and shortly afterward treated Berlusconi for two broken teeth and facial injuries after he was attacked with a marble statue at a political rally. In February 2010, she was selected as one of the candidates representing Berlusconi's The People of Freedom party, despite her lack of any political experience, and was seated on the Regional Council of Lombardy the following month.

The Guardian reported that according to a series of media reports in October 2010, Berlusconi had met El Mahroug, then 17, through Nicole Minetti. Mahroug insisted that she had not slept with the then 74-year-old prime minister. She told Italian newspapers that she merely attended dinner at his mansion near Milan. El Mahroug said she sat next to Berlusconi, who later took her upstairs and gave her an envelope containing €7,000. She said he also gave her jewellery.

Berlusconi came under fire for reportedly spending $1.8 million in state funds from RAI Cinema to further the career of a largely unknown Bulgarian actress, Michelle Bonev. The fact that this coincided with severe cuts being made to the country's arts budget provoked a strong reaction from the public.

In January 2011, Berlusconi was placed under criminal investigation relating to El Mahroug for allegedly having sex with an underage prostitute and for abuse of office relating to her release from detention. Berlusconi's lawyers were quick to deny the allegations as "absurd and without foundation" and called the investigation a "serious interference with the private life of the prime minister without precedent in the judicial history of the country".

On 15 February 2011, a judge indicted Berlusconi to stand trial on charges carrying up to 15 years in prison. Paying for sex with a minor in Italy is punished within a range of six months to three years imprisonment, while the crime of malfeasance in office (It: concussione) is more severely punished, from four years to twelve years imprisonment, as it is considered a type of extortion committed by a public officer.

The fast-track trial opened on 6 April and was adjourned until 31 May. El Mahroug's lawyer said that Mahroug would not be attaching herself to the case as a civil complainant and denies that she ever made herself available for money. Another alleged victim, Giorgia Iafrate, also decided not to be a party to the case. In January 2013, judges rejected an application from Berlusconi's lawyers to have the trial adjourned so that it would not interfere with Italy's 2013 general election in which Berlusconi participated.

On 24 June 2013, Berlusconi was found guilty of paying for sex with an underage prostitute and of abusing his office. He was sentenced to seven years in prison, one more year than had been requested by the prosecution, and banned from public office for life. In the trial, the prosecution claimed that Berlusconi had paid over 4.5 million euros in total for El Mahroug's services. Berlusconi appealed the sentence and his conviction was quashed a year later, on 18 July 2014.

On 1 March 2019, the Moroccan model Imane Fadil, who was one of the main witnesses in the process, died in strange circumstances, allegedly killed by radioactive poisoning.

In 2020, Wondery released a podcast about Berlusconi's rise and fall entitled Bunga Bunga hosted by comedienne Whitney Cummings.

Panama Papers 

In April 2016, the Panama Papers scandal broke out; it was a leaked set of 11.5 million confidential documents that provide detailed information about more than 214,000 offshore companies listed by the Panamanian corporate service provider Mossack Fonseca, including the identities of shareholders and directors of the companies. The documents show how wealthy individuals, including public officials, hid their assets from public scrutiny. Berlusconi was cited in the list, along with his long-time partner at A.C. Milan, Adriano Galliani.

Health

Assault at rally
On 13 December 2009, Berlusconi was hit in the face with an alabaster statuette of Milan Cathedral after a rally in Milan's Piazza del Duomo. As Berlusconi was shaking hands with the public, a man in the crowd stepped forward and launched the statuette at him. The assailant was subsequently detained and identified as Massimo Tartaglia, a 42-year-old surveyor with a history of mental illness but no criminal record, living in the outskirts of Milan. According to a letter released to the Italian news agency ANSA, Tartaglia has apologised for the attack, writing: "I don't recognise myself", and adding that he had "acted alone [with no] form of militancy or political affiliation". Berlusconi suffered facial injuries, a broken nose and two broken teeth; he was subsequently hospitalised. Italian president Giorgio Napolitano and politicians from all parties in Italy condemned the attack.

In the night of 15–16 December, a 26-year-old man was stopped by police and Berlusconi's bodyguards while trying to gain access to Berlusconi's hospital room. A search revealed that he carried no weapons, although three hockey sticks and two knives were later found in his car. The suspect was known to have a history of mental illness and mandatory treatment in mental institutions.

Berlusconi was discharged from the hospital on 17 December 2009.

Heart problems
On 7 June 2016, after the campaign for the local elections, Berlusconi was hospitalized to the San Raffaele Hospital in Milan because of heart problems. After two days, on 9 June, his personal doctor Alberto Zangrillo announced that the stroke could have killed him and he must have a heart surgery to replace a defective aortic valve.

COVID-19
On 2 September 2020, amid the worldwide COVID-19 pandemic, Berlusconi tested positive for COVID-19. He had had contact with businessman Flavio Briatore, who had been hospitalized after contracting the virus, and with his daughter Barbara and his son Luigi, who had also tested positive. The following day, Berlusconi announced he was well and continuing to work; on the next day, 3 September, he was admitted to the San Raffaele Hospital in Milan with bilateral pneumonia. Professor Alberto Zangrillo, head of intensive care at San Raffaele Hospital, said on 11 September 2020 that Berlusconi was admitted with a very high and dangerous viral load, but that he was improving and his response to the disease had been "optimal".

On 14 September, he was discharged from the hospital. Berlusconi described the COVID-19 as "the most dangerous and frightening experience" of his lifetime.

In May 2021, he was once again hospitalized due to COVID-19 long-term consequences.

Personal fortune

In 2012, Forbes magazine reported that Berlusconi was Italy's sixth richest man, with a net worth of $5.9 billion. He holds significant assets in television, newspaper, publishing, cinema, finance, banking, insurance, and sports.

Berlusconi's main company, Mediaset, operates three national television channels, which in total cover half of the national television sector; and Publitalia (it), the leading Italian advertising and publicity agency. Berlusconi also owns a controlling stake in Arnoldo Mondadori Editore, the largest Italian publishing house, whose publications include Panorama, one of the country's most popular news magazines. His brother, Paolo Berlusconi, owns and operates il Giornale, a centre-right newspaper that provides a pro-Berlusconi slant on Italian politics. Il Foglio, one of the most influential Italian right-wing newspapers, is partially owned by his former wife, Veronica Lario. After Lario sold some of her ownership in 2010, Paolo Berlusconi acquired a majority interest in the newspaper. He founded and is the major shareholder of Fininvest, which is among the largest private companies in Italy; it operates in media and finance. With Ennio Doris he founded Mediolanum, one of the country's biggest banking and insurance groups. He has interests in cinema and home video distribution (Medusa Film and Penta Film). He also owned the football club A.C. Milan from 1986 to 2017, and currently owns A.C. Monza (since 2018).

Electoral history

First-past-the-post elections

Works by Silvio Berlusconi

Honours and awards 
 : Knight of the Order of Merit for Labour (1977–2014); Berlusconi voluntarily resigned from this order on 18 March 2014.
 : Knight Grand Cross of the Order of Pius IX (2005)
 : Grand Cross of the Order of Merit of the Republic of Poland (2002)
 : Grand Officer of the Order of the Three Stars (2005)
 : Recipient of the Al-Fateh Medal (2009)
 : Honorary Companion of Honour of the National Order of Merit (2004)
: Grand Cross of the Royal Norwegian Order of Merit (2001)
 : Grand Cross of the Order of the Star of Romania (2002)
 : Member 1st Class of the Order of Abdulaziz al Saud (22 November 2009)
  House of Bourbon-Two Sicilies: Knight Grand Cross of the Sacred Military Constantinian Order of Saint George

In films

Documentaries 
 Citizen Berlusconi – The Prime Minister and the Press, 2003
 Viva Zapatero!, directed by Sabina Guzzanti, 2005
 Quando c'era Silvio, documentary film directed by Beppe Cremagnani and Enrico Deaglio, 2005

Feature films 
 Draquila – L'Italia che trema (directed by Sabina Guzzanti, Cannes Film Festival, 2010)
 Videocracy (directed by Erik Gandini, 2009)
 "Bye Bye Berlusconi!/Buonanotte Topolino"
 Il Caimano (directed by Nanni Moretti, 2006)
 Shooting Silvio (directed by Berardo Carboni)
 Citizen Berlusconi (directed by Andrea Cairola and Susan Gray)
 Loro (directed by Paolo Sorrentino, 2018)

See also 
 Forbes list of billionaires (2011)
 List of Italian Prime Ministers by time in office#Italian Republic (1946–present)
 List of longest-serving G8 leaders

References

Further reading 

 Diodato, Emidio, and Federico Niglia. Berlusconi 'The Diplomat': Populism and Foreign Policy in Italy (Springer, 2018).
 Amedeo Benedetti, Il linguaggio e la retorica della nuova politica italiana: Silvio Berlusconi e Forza Italia, Erga, Genova, 2004, 
 L'odore dei soldi. Origini e misteri delle fortune di Silvio Berlusconi (Elio Veltri and Marco Travaglio, 2001, Editori Riuniti).
 Berlusconi bankruptcy risks and legal investigation before entering politics: Mani pulite. La vera storia. Da Mario Chiesa a Silvio Berlusconi (Gianni Barbacetto, Peter Gomez and Marco Travaglio, 2002, Editori Riuniti) 
 L'amico degli amici. (Marco Travaglio and Peter Gomez, 2005, RCS MediaGroup) 
 Gustau Navarro i Barba Bagasses, lladres i ministres al país de Berlusconi Edicions dels A.L.I.LL, Mataró, 2009.  
 "The Thing Berluscony", by Nobel Prize Winner José Saramago, El País, 7 June 2009. Retrieved 7 June 2009
 "Italy immunity law provokes fury", BBC news, 25 June 2003. Retrieved 24 December 2004
 "Italy's left attacks Berlusconi", BBC news, 11 December 2004. Retrieved 22 January 2005
 "Berlusconi plans to get off the hook", The Observer, 7 October 2001. Retrieved 1 February 2005
 "Italian Senate passes disputed bill", BBC News, 2 August 2002. Retrieved 1 February 2005
 "Berlusconi scores double victory", BBC News, 5 November 2002. Retrieved 1 February 2005
 "Berlusconi ally jailed for bribery", BBC News, 29 April 2003. Retrieved 1 February 2005
 "Berlusconi ally partially cleared", BBC News, 22 November 2003. Retrieved 1 February 2005
 "Berlusconi warns 'subversive' judges", BBC News, 8 August 2003. Retrieved 1 February 2005
 "Berlusconi stuns Italian judges", BBC News, 5 September 2003. Retrieved 1 February 2005
 "Italian judges fight reforms", BBC News, 20 June 2002. Retrieved 1 February 2005
 "Italian magistrates go on strike", BBC News, 25 May 2004. Retrieved 1 February 2005
 "Italian president blocks reforms", BBC News, 16 December 2004. Retrieved 1 February 2005
 Q&A: "Berlusconi's battle with the courts", BBC News, 24 January 2002. Retrieved 1 February 2005
 "New storm over Berlusconi remarks", BBC News, 11 September 2003. Retrieved 2 February 2005
 "Jewish communities split over Berlusconi", BBC News, 26 September 2003. Retrieved 2 February 2005
 
 Italian high court upholds Berlusconi's sentence in tax fraud case – CNN.com CNN:Italian high court upholds Berlusconi's sentence in tax fraud case

External links

 Fanclub website
 Profile: Silvio Berlusconi, BBC
 A chronology of Berlusconi's life from Ketupa.net
 Forbes.com: Forbes World's Richest People 
 BBC News Europe: Berlusconi in his own words
 Forza Italia, Berlusconi's political movement; click on International for an English version. 
 A popular paper spread among the members of the European Parliament about Berlusconi's life chronology, mysteries and trials. By Marco Travaglio and Peter Gomez.  "EN" 
 

 
1936 births
21st-century Italian criminals
21st-century Italian politicians
A.C. Milan chairmen and investors
A.C. Milan directors
Forza Italia politicians
International Emmy Directorate Award
Italian anti-communists
Italian billionaires
Italian football chairmen and investors
Italian mass media owners
Italian newspaper publishers (people)
Italian politicians convicted of crimes
Italian publishers (people)
Italian Roman Catholics
Living people
Members of the Chamber of Deputies (Italy)
People expelled from public office
Businesspeople from Milan
People named in the Panama Papers
Politicians convicted of fraud
Presidents of the European Council
Prime Ministers of Italy
Grand Crosses of the Order of the Star of Romania
The People of Freedom politicians
Forza Italia (2013) politicians
University of Milan alumni
MEPs for Italy 2019–2024
Politicians from Milan
Mass media people from Milan
Forza Italia (2013) senators
Italian political party founders
Italian Freemasons